Addey is a surname. People with this surname include:

 John Addey (shipbuilder) (1550-1606), English shipwright
 John Addey (astrologer) (1920-1982), English astrologer

See also
Addey and Stanhope School, Deptford, London, England - named for the shipbuilder
Addy (disambiguation)
Addie (disambiguation)